The John A. Davis House, also known as Albany Little Theatre, is the home of a theater, Theatre Albany.  
The house, which has architectural distinction, was built in about 1853, and a contemporary theater with no architectural pretensions was added at the rear in the 1960s.  The building was listed on the National Register of Historic Places in 1980.

The house was originally built as an Italianate villa with a central brick tower flanked by one-story wooden porches.  A Classical Revival portico and porches were added in the early 1900s.

References

External links
Official website of Theatre Albany

Italianate architecture in Georgia (U.S. state)
Neoclassical architecture in Georgia (U.S. state)
Houses completed in 1853
Dougherty County, Georgia
Houses on the National Register of Historic Places in Georgia (U.S. state)
Theatres in Georgia (U.S. state)
Buildings and structures in Albany, Georgia
Houses in Dougherty County, Georgia
National Register of Historic Places in Dougherty County, Georgia